Matthé Pronk (born 1 July 1974 in Warmenhuizen) is a Dutch former professional road bicycle racer.

He grew up in a family of cyclists: Mattheus Pronk was his father, Jos Pronk is his brother and Bas Giling is his cousin.

Major results 

1996
 National Track Championships
1st  Scratch
2nd Madison
1997
 1st Overall Tour de la province de Liège
1st Stages 1 & 2
 1st Stage 1 Tour de Wallonie
1998
 1st Overall Olympia's Tour
 1st Internationale Wielertrofee Jong Maar Moedig
 1st Stage 5 Circuit des Mines
 6th Hel van het Mergelland
1999
 6th Nokere Koerse
2000
 2nd GP Rik Van Steenbergen
 5th Le Samyn
 9th GP Stad Zottegem
 10th Henk Vos Memorial
2001
 3rd Omloop Het Volk
 3rd Giro del Piemonte
 3rd Points race, National Track Championships
 7th Henk Vos Memorial
 9th Milano–Torino
2002
 1st Grote Prijs Stad Zottegem
 2nd Trofeo Calvià
 3rd Points race, National Track Championships
 5th GP Rik Van Steenbergen
 9th Trofeo Cala Millor-Cala Bona
 10th Grote Prijs Jef Scherens
2003
 National Track Championships
1st  Derny
1st  Madison (with Jos Pronk)
1st  Points race
2nd Scratch
 1st Druivenkoers Overijse
 1st Nokere Koerse
 2nd Ronde van Noord-Holland
 4th Rund um den Flughafen Köln-Bonn
 7th GP Stad Vilvoorde
 9th Overall Driedaagse van West Vlaanderen
 9th Grand Prix d'Isbergues
 10th Veenendaal–Veenendaal
2004
 World Derny Hour Record (66,11 km)
 1st Profronde van Fryslan (with 21 others)
 2nd Points race, National Track Championships
 5th Overall Sachsen-Tour
 6th Nationale Sluitingprijs
 6th Trofeo Alcudia
 8th Paris–Brussels
 9th Trofeo Calvià
2005
 2nd Flèche Hesbignonne
 7th Overall Étoile de Bessèges
 7th Nokere Koerse
 10th Grote Prijs Jef Scherens
2006
 2nd  Derny, European Track Championships
 6th Grand Prix d'Isbergues
2007
 1st  Derny, UEC European Track Championships
 8th Grote Prijs Jef Scherens
2008
 1st  Derny, UEC European Track Championships

References

External links 

1974 births
Living people
People from Harenkarspel
Dutch male cyclists
Cyclists from North Holland
21st-century Dutch people